Marion Edward Glassgow (born April 30, 1934) is an American former politician. He served in the South Dakota House of Representatives in 1983 to 1984 and in the Senate from 1985 to 1988.

References

1934 births
Living people
Republican Party members of the South Dakota House of Representatives
Republican Party South Dakota state senators
People from Lead, South Dakota